The Catch is a Channel 5 and My5 four-part drama series set in the west of England, adapted by Michael Crompton from the 2020 novel of the same name by T.M.Logan. Starring Jason Watkins, Aneurin Barnard, Poppy Gilbert and Cathy Belton. The first episode was broadcast on Channel 5 and My5 in the UK on 25 January 2023.

Plot
Local fisherman, Ed Collier struggles to make a decent living because of competing fishermen. Abbie, his daughter, introduces her new boyfriend Ryan, to her parents. Ed is suspicious of Ryan, who is young, handsome, rich and successful. Ed's wife, Claire presumes Ed is being overprotective, understandably, as they lost their son to a boating accident 15 years ago. Ed teams up with Abbie's ex-boyfriend, George to investigate Ryan's history and is startled at what he finds. Ed follows Ryan to the red-light district and films him with a young woman, later he confronts Ryan about it in front of the family. However, Ryan's answer is acceptable, driving Ed's family to turn against him, and things get darker when an ominous threatening message appears painted on the decking of his boat.

Cast
 Jason Watkins as Ed Collier 
 Aneurin Barnard as Ryan Wilson
 Poppy Gilbert as Abbie Collier
 Cathy Belton as Claire Collier 
 Brenda Fricker as Phyllis Doyle 
 Jade Jordan as Katz 
 Tracy Wiles as DI Jennie Nott 
 Ian Pirie as Bob Chapman 
 Morgan Palmeria as George 
 Cameron Jack as Craig 
 Menyee Lai as Pauline 
 Paul Sparkes as Wayne Pendrick 
 Jacob Hickey as Josh 
 Karl Hogan as Baxter

Filming
The Catch was filmed during the summer of 2022, Robert Quinn was the director.  Even though the setting for the drama is the south-west of England, the actual filming took place at Balbriggan and other locations in County Dublin, Ireland. The Colliers' house is said to have been a home of former Irish president, Patrick Hillery.

Production
The production was by Projector Pictures, in association with Night Train Media and All3Media International. Rachel Gesua, Suzi McIntosh and Trevor Eve were executive producers on behalf of Projector Pictures, and Herbert Kloiber was executive producer for Night Train Media.

Broadcast
It was first broadcast on Channel 5 and My5 in the UK on 25 January 2023, broken into four one-hour episodes.

References

External links

2023 British television series debuts
2023 British television series endings
2020s British drama television series
2020s British television miniseries
Channel 5 (British TV channel) original programming
British thriller television series
English-language television shows